Galimuyod, officially the Municipality of Galimuyod, is a 4th class municipality in the province of Ilocos Sur, Philippines. According to the 2020 census, it has a population of 10,244 people.

Etymology
This town, formerly known as Cabisilan, was once the biggest barrio of Candon during the Spanish Regime.  A land dispute between them and residents of neighboring Sapang, another barrio of Candon, resulted in a "gin-nuyod" (Ilocano for "tug-of-war") contest, a common game during those days, to settle it.  The people of Cabisilan won over the people of Sapang, making Cabisilan the center of barrios near it.  The old folks renamed the barrio Galimuyod, from the Ilocano words tali ("rope") and ginuyod ("pulled").

Geography

Barangays
Galimuyod is politically subdivided into 24 barangays. These barangays are headed by elected officials: Barangay Captain, Barangay Council, whose members are called Barangay Councilors. All are elected every three years.

 Abaya
 Baracbac
 Bidbiday
 Bitong
 Borobor
 Calimugtong
 Calongbuyan
 Calumbaya
 Daldagan
 Kilang
 Legaspi
 Mabayag
 Matanubong
 Mckinley
 Nagsingcaoan
 Oaig-Daya
 Pagangpang
 Patac
 Poblacion
 Rubio
 Sabangan-Bato
 Sacaang
 San Vicente
 Sapang

Climate

Demographics

In the 2020 census, Galimuyod had a population of 10,244.

Government
Galimuyod, belonging to the second congressional district of the province of Ilocos Sur, is governed by a mayor designated as its local chief executive and by a municipal council as its legislative body in accordance with the Local Government Code. The mayor, vice mayor, and the councilors are elected directly by the people through an election which is being held every three years.

Elected officials

References

External links
Pasyalang Ilocos Sur
Philippine Standard Geographic Code
Philippine Census Information
Local Governance Performance Management System 

Municipalities of Ilocos Sur